Total Eclipse is a first person adventure game released for the Amiga, Atari ST, Amstrad CPC, Commodore 64, MS-DOS and ZX Spectrum computers in 1988. It can also be considered an early example of a first-person shooter.

Plot
The game backstory as explained in the manual is that an evil Ancient Egyptian priest has put a curse on a massive pyramid dedicated to the Sun God, Ra. Any object obstructing Ra's shrine from the Sun would be destroyed. The protagonist is an unnamed archeologist who learns that October 26, 1930, a total eclipse will obstruct the sun above Cairo, and the protagonist realized that the curse will cause the Moon to explode, devastating Earth with its debris. The protagonist then decides to travel to that pyramid and destroy the shrine to Ra, preventing the curse/prophecy.

The game starts with the protagonist having just arrived with a biplane parked outside the pyramid he is about to enter, two hours before the eclipse. The player has to enter and explore the pyramid, avoid traps, trigger and activate puzzles and navigate through maze-like rooms. Causes of death include dehydration, and heart attack caused by various hazards such as falling off ledges, getting crushed by falling stones and taking hits from poison darts. Throughout the maze the player can discover treasure to accumulate the score, and also ankhs that serve as keys to locked doors.

Gameplay

Like the previous Freescape games developed by Major Developments, Total Eclipse takes place from the point of view of the main character, who can move freely within the 3D environment of the game. This time, however, the emphasis is more on adventure, puzzle-solving and survival; with multi-level environments to move around and explore.

The key elements of the game consist of:
A water jar, with water which diminishes as the player progresses; when it is empty the player will die of dehydration. The jar can be refilled with water found around the levels.
A heart-rate monitor, which actually serves as a health indicator. When the player suffers from damage or walks around a dangerous area, the rate will go higher. The player can keep it lower by resting, sacrificing some of the available time.
A flash-light, with a limited battery-life, which allows you to explore some of the darker areas of the game. 
A magnetic compass for navigation
A wrist watch which shows the remaining time.
A pistol which is used for manipulating the environment, such as shooting at doors, chests and mechanisms to open or trigger them. There are also a few enemies.

Items that can be found in the pyramid are 
Pairs of symbols, which the player must shoot in order to trigger something (e.g. open a locked door)
Pools or fountains of water to fill the water jar.
Ankhs that serve as keys to barred doors; these are finite throughout the pyramid, and part of the challenge consists not wasting them.
The player can also find treasure, which simply serves as a side quest and only accumulates score.

Development
Total Eclipse was the third game to use the Freescape engine, which allowed the production of full three-dimensional environments using filled polygons in which the player could move around freely. However, the engine was improved for this release, adding spheres to the collection of shapes used for building the 3D environments.

Like the previous Freescape-based games, it also gave the player the ability to 'crouch', and look up and down, as well as rotate left and right, something which was rare amongst 3D games of the time. The same engine was used for its sequel, Total Eclipse II: The Sphinx Jinx.

Reception
Amiga/ST Format gave Total Eclipse a score of 78% in its July issue of 1989, bemoaning the similarity to previous Freescape games as its biggest downfall. The reviewer, Gary Barett, concluded, "Do not misunderstand me, though, Total Eclipse is the best of Freescape games, but the originality has gone".

Zzap! awarded a higher score of 84%, praising the game's moody music and claustrophobic feel, and stating that "Dark Side comes close in terms of realism but to my mind Total Eclipse has a lot better atmosphere".

References

External links
 
Freeware remake of Total Eclipse 

1988 video games
Amiga games
Amstrad CPC games
Atari ST games
Commodore 64 games
DOS games
First-person shooters
Freescape games
Incentive Software games
Single-player video games
Video games based on Egyptian mythology
Video games developed in the United Kingdom
Video games set in 1930
Video games set in Egypt
ZX Spectrum games